Sandhja Kuivalainen (born 16 March 1991), known professionally as simply Sandhja, is a Finnish singer. She represented Finland in the Eurovision Song Contest 2016 with the song "Sing It Away". Sandhja was born to an Indo-Guyanese mother and a Finnish father.

Career

2013–14: Gold
Sandhja released her debut single "Hold Me" on 15 November 2013 as the lead single from her debut studio album. On 7 March 2014 she released "Gold" as the second single from her debut studio album. She released her debut studio album Gold on 23 May 2014 through Sony Music Entertainment Finland.

2015–present: Eurovision Song Contest and Freedom Venture

In May 2015 she featured on Brandon Bauer's single "The Flavor". On 30 October 2015 she released the single "My Bass". Sandhja was announced as one of the 18 competing artists in Uuden Musiikin Kilpailu 2016 on 12 January 2016. She competed in the third semi-final and advanced to the final. In the final, she was declared the winner after winning the jury vote and placing third with the public. She represented Finland in the Eurovision Song Contest 2016, performing first of all contestants in the first semi-final on 10 May 2016 at the Ericsson Globe in Stockholm, Sweden, but failed to qualify for the May 14 final. Her second studio album Freedom Venture, was released on 29 April 2016.

Discography

Albums

Singles

As lead artist

As featured artist

References

External links 

Living people
1991 births
21st-century Finnish women singers
Finnish pop singers
Eurovision Song Contest entrants for Finland
Eurovision Song Contest entrants of 2016
Singers from Helsinki
Finnish people of Indo-Guyanese descent